In mathematics, the upper and lower incomplete gamma functions are types of special functions which arise as solutions to various mathematical problems such as certain integrals.

Their respective names stem from their integral definitions, which are defined similarly to the gamma function but with different or "incomplete" integral limits. The gamma function is defined as an integral from zero to infinity. This contrasts with the lower incomplete gamma function, which is defined as an integral from zero to a variable upper limit. Similarly, the upper incomplete gamma function is defined as an integral from a variable lower limit to infinity.

Definition
The upper incomplete gamma function is defined as:

whereas the lower incomplete gamma function is defined as:

Properties

By integration by parts  we find the recurrence relations

and

Since the ordinary gamma function is defined as

we have

and

Continuation to complex values

Complex analysis shows how properties of the real incomplete gamma functions extend to their holomorphic counterparts.

Lower incomplete gamma function

Holomorphic extension
Repeated application of the recurrence relation for the lower incomplete gamma function leads to the power series expansion: 

Hence, the following decomposition

 ,

Multi-valuedness
The complex logarithm  is determined up to a multiple of  only, which renders it multi-valued. Functions involving the complex logarithm typically inherit this property. Among these are the complex power, and, since  appears in its decomposition, the -function, too.

The indeterminacy of multi-valued functions introduces complications, since it must be stated how to select a value. Strategies to handle this are:
 (the most general way) replace the domain  of multi-valued functions by a suitable manifold in  called Riemann surface. While this removes multi-valuedness, one has to know the theory behind it ;
 restrict the domain such that a multi-valued function decomposes into separate single-valued branches, which can be handled individually.

The following set of rules can be used to interpret formulas in this section correctly. If not mentioned otherwise, the following is assumed:

Sectors
Sectors in  having their vertex at  often prove to be appropriate domains for complex expressions. Often,  can be arbitrarily chosen and is not specified then. Note: In many applications and texts,  is silently taken to be 0, which centers the sector around the positive real axis.

Branches
In particular, a single-valued and holomorphic logarithm exists on any such sector D having its imaginary part bound to the range . However, in any given context here,  is assumed fixed and all branches involved are associated to it. If , the branches are called principal, because they equal their real analogues on the positive real axis. Note: In many applications and texts, formulas hold only for principal branches.

Relation between branches

Behavior near branch point
The decomposition above further shows, that γ behaves near  asymptotically like:

This seems to justify setting  for real . However, matters are somewhat different in the complex realm. Also note that such a continuation is by no means an analytic one.

Algebraic relations
All algebraic relations and differential equations observed by the real  hold for its holomorphic counterpart as well. This is a consequence of the identity theorem, stating that equations between holomorphic functions valid on a real interval, hold everywhere.

Integral representation
The last relation tells us, that, for fixed ,  is a primitive or antiderivative of the holomorphic function . Consequently, for any complex ,

holds, as long as the path of integration is entirely contained in the domain of a branch of the integrand.

Limit for

Real values

s complex
This result extends to complex . Then

where

has been used in the middle. It follows

for all complex  not a non-positive integer,  real and  principal.

Sectorwise convergence
Now let  be from the sector  with some fixed ,  be the principal branch on this sector, and look at

As shown above, the first difference can be made arbitrarily small, if  is sufficiently large. The second difference allows for following estimation:

In total we now have:

if  is not a non-negative integer,  is arbitrarily small, but fixed, and  denotes the principal branch on this domain.

Overview
 is:

Upper incomplete gamma function

at points , where the right hand side exists.

Complex analysis guarantees holomorphicity, because  proves to be bounded in a neighbourhood of that limit for a fixed .

or

which, as a series representation of the entire  function, converges for all complex  (and all complex  not a non-positive integer).

With its restriction to real values lifted, the series allows the expansion:

When :

( is the Euler–Mascheroni constant here), hence,

 is:

Special values

 if  is a positive integer,
  if  is a positive integer,
 ,
 ,
 ,
 ,
 ,
 .

Asymptotic behavior

Evaluation formulae

The lower gamma function can be evaluated using the power series expansion: 

where is the Pochhammer symbol.

An alternative expansion is

where  is Kummer's confluent hypergeometric function.

Connection with Kummer's confluent hypergeometric function

where  has an infinite radius of convergence.

Again with confluent hypergeometric functions and employing Kummer's identity,

For the actual computation of numerical values, Gauss's continued fraction provides a useful expansion:

This continued fraction converges for all complex , provided only that  is not a negative integer.

The upper gamma function has the continued fraction

and

Multiplication theorem
The following multiplication theorem holds true:

Software Implementation
The incomplete gamma functions are available in various of the computer algebra systems.

Even if unavailable directly, however, incomplete function values can be calculated using functions commonly included in spreadsheets (and computer algebra packages).  In Excel, for example, these can be calculated using the gamma function combined with the gamma distribution function.
The lower incomplete function:   = EXP(GAMMALN(s))*GAMMA.DIST(x,s,1,TRUE).
The upper incomplete function:   = EXP(GAMMALN(s))*(1-GAMMA.DIST(x,s,1,TRUE)).
These follow from the definition of the gamma distribution's cumulative distribution function.

In python although Scipy provides implementations of incomplete gamma functions under `scipy.special`, it does not support negative values for the first argument. One workaround in such cases is to use the function "gammainc" from the library "mpmath".

Regularized gamma functions and Poisson random variables 

Two related functions are the regularized gamma functions:

 is the cumulative distribution function for gamma random variables with shape parameter  and scale parameter 1.

When  is an integer,  is the cumulative distribution function for Poisson random variables: If  is a  random variable then

This formula can be derived by repeated integration by parts.

In the context of the stable count distribution, the  parameter can be regarded as inverse of Lévy's stability parameter : 

where  is a standard stable count distribution of shape .

Derivatives 

The derivative with respect to its first argument  is given by

and the second derivative by

where the function  is a special case of the Meijer G-function

This particular special case has internal closure properties of its own because it can be used to express all successive derivatives. In general, 

where  is the permutation defined by the Pochhammer symbol:

All such derivatives can be generated in succession from:

and

with the understanding that  is not a negative integer or zero.  In such a case, one must use a limit. Results for  can be obtained by analytic continuation. Some special cases of this function can be simplified. For example, where  is the Exponential integral. These derivatives and the function  provide exact solutions to a number of integrals by repeated differentiation of the integral definition of the upper incomplete gamma function.
For example,

This formula can be further inflated or generalized to a huge class of Laplace transforms and Mellin transforms. When combined with a computer algebra system, the exploitation of special functions provides a powerful method for solving definite integrals, in particular those encountered by practical engineering applications (see Symbolic integration for more details).

Indefinite and definite integrals

The following indefinite integrals are readily obtained using integration by parts (with the constant of integration omitted in both cases):

The lower and the upper incomplete Gamma function are connected via the Fourier transform:

Notes

References 
   §6.5.
 
 
 G. Arfken and H. Weber. Mathematical Methods for Physicists. Harcourt/Academic Press, 2000. (See Chapter 10.)
 
 
 
 
  (See also www.netlib.org/toms/654).

External links 
  — Regularized Lower Incomplete Gamma Function Calculator
  — Regularized Upper Incomplete Gamma Function Calculator
  — Lower Incomplete Gamma Function Calculator
  — Upper Incomplete Gamma Function Calculator
 formulas and identities of the Incomplete Gamma Function functions.wolfram.com

Gamma and related functions
Continued fractions